QtScript is a scripting engine that has been part of the Qt cross-platform application framework since version 4.3.0.

The scripting language is based on the ECMAScript standard with a few extensions, such as QObject-style signal and slot connections. The library contains the engine, and a C++ API for evaluating QtScript code and exposing custom QObject-derived C++ classes to QtScript.

The QtScript Binding Generator provides bindings for the Qt API to access directly from ECMAScript. QtScript and the binding generator are used for Amarok 2's scripting system.

The current (as of Qt 4.7) implementation uses JavaScriptCore and will not be further developed. The module is deprecated as of Qt 5.5.

Qt Script for Applications (QSA) 
An earlier and unrelated scripting engine, called Qt Script for Applications (QSA), was shipped by Trolltech as a separate Qt-based library, dual-licensed under GPL and a commercial license.

With the release of QtScript, QSA has been deprecated and reached its end of life in 2008.

References

External links 
 Qt: Making applications scriptable
 QtScript module
 QSA documentation (version 1.2.2)
 Last working snapshot of QSA homepage from archive.org
 QSA download directory

Free computer libraries
JavaScript dialect engines
Qt (software)